Polychalca is a genus of tortoise beetles belonging to the family Chrysomelidae.

Subgenus and species

Subgenus
 Desmonota Hope, 1839
 Polychalca aerea (Boheman, 1850)
 Polychalca duponti (Boheman, 1850)
 Polychalca gravida (Boheman, 1850)
 Polychalca platynota (Germar, 1824)
 Polychalca salebrosa (Boheman, 1850)

Subgenus
 Polychalca Chevrolat, 1837
 Polychalca cariosa (Boheman, 1850)
 Polychalca decora (Perty, 1830)
 Polychalca dentipennis (Boheman, 1850)
 Polychalca nickerli (Spaeth, 1907)
 Polychalca perforata (Boheman, 1850)
 Polychalca punctatissima (Wolf, 1818)
 Polychalca turpis (Boheman, 1850)

References
 Biolib
 Biol.uni.wroc.pl

Cassidinae